The Vridi Canal, or Canal de Vridi, is a navigable canal in Ivory Coast, connecting the port of Abidjan to the Atlantic Ocean. It was constructed in 1950 and takes its name from the village of Vridi.

References 

Bodies of water of Ivory Coast
Geography of Ivory Coast